The 1927–28 Pittsburgh Pirates season was the third season of the Pirates ice hockey team in the National Hockey League.

Offseason

Regular season

Final standings

Record vs. opponents

Game log

Playoffs
They made it into the playoffs.  They went against the Rangers in the first round and lost 6 goals to 4, or 4–6

Player stats

Regular season
Scoring

Goaltending

Playoffs
Scoring

Goaltending

Note: GP = Games played; G = Goals; A = Assists; Pts = Points; +/- = Plus/minus; PIM = Penalty minutes; PPG=Power-play goals; SHG=Short-handed goals; GWG=Game-winning goals
      MIN=Minutes played; W = Wins; L = Losses; T = Ties; GA = Goals against; GAA = Goals against average; SO = Shutouts;

Awards and records

Transactions

See also
1927–28 NHL season

References

Pittsburgh
Pittsburgh
Pittsburgh Pirates (NHL) seasons